Kevin R. Cox is a British-American geographer (born in Warwick, England in 1939), who holds the position of Distinguished University Professor, in the Department of Geography, of The Ohio State University

Biography
He holds a BA degree from Cambridge University (1961) and a PhD from the University of Illinois at Urbana–Champaign (1966), and has since then taught at Ohio State. He is commonly seen as a political geographer.

Work
He was initially prominent in the revival of geographic studies of voting. Drawing on the methods of the spatial-quantitative research, he demonstrated  the significance of where people live and their connections over space for how they vote. This in turn led to an interest in a newly emerging field of behavioral geography.

Most of his later work has been focused on urban studies, inspired by various forms of political economy, particularly  from welfare geography. One of his contributions was work on resident organizations, establishing their raison d'être and situating them historically. This was followed by an increasing emphasis on the implications of Marxism for studying the politics of urbanization. He has been interested in the role of growth coalitions in the politics of local development and how the American politics contrasts with that of the countries of Western Europe. He has also worked on the history of geographic thought and the political geography of South Africa.

He has been a recipient of the Honors Award (1985) and the Lifetime Achievement Award (2012) of the Association of American Geographers. He has been a Guggenheim Scholar (2001). At Ohio State he received the Distinguished Scholar Award (1997) and is currently Distinguished University Professor (2003).'

A festschrift was published in his honor in 2012.

A review of his book, Boomtown Columbus, was published in Cleveland Review of Books, where it was praised as adeptly explaining how "developers and their friends in local government pursued postindustrial urbanism to the detriment of the working poor."

Publications
His books are: 
Conflict, Power and Politics in the City: A Geographic Approach. New York 1973: McGraw Hill Inc.
Location and Public Problems: An Introduction to Political Geography. Chicago 1979: Maaroufa Press.
Political Geography: State, Territory and Politics. Oxford 2002: Blackwell.
Making Human Geography.  New York 2013: Guilford Press.
The Politics of Urban and Regional Development and the American Exception. Syracuse NY 2016: Syracuse University Press.
Boomtown Columbus: Ohio’s Sunbelt City and How Developers Got Their Way. Ohio State Press 2021.

Some of his key peer-reviewed publications include:
"The Voting Decision in a Spatial Context," in C Board, R J Chorley, P Haggett and D R Stoddart (Eds.), Progress in Geography I London, 1969: Edward Arnold, pp. 81–117.
"Social Change, Turf Politics and Concepts of Turf Politics," in A. Kirby, P. Knox and S. Pinch (Eds.), Public Provision and Urban Development.  London, 1984:  Croom Helm.
"Globalization, Competition and the Politics of Local Economic Development," Urban Studies (1995) 32:2, 213-224.
"Spaces of Dependence, Spaces of Engagement and the Politics of Scale, or: Looking for Local Politics," Political Geography (1998) 17:1, 1-24.
(with R Negi) "The State and the Question of Development in Sub-Saharan Africa," Review of African Political Economy 37:123 (2010), 71-85.
"Notes on a Brief Encounter: Critical Realism, Historical Materialism and Human Geography," Dialogues in Human Geography 3:1 (2013), 3-21.
"Territory, Scale, and Why Capitalism Matters," Territory, Politics and Governance 1:1 (2013), 46-61.

References

External links
Official Web page at OSU

1939 births
Living people
British emigrants to the United States
American geographers
British geographers
Ohio State University faculty
Alumni of the University of Cambridge
University of Illinois Urbana-Champaign alumni
People from Warwick
Political geographers